Barry Almeida (born November 20, 1988) is a retired American professional ice hockey center who last played for the Worcester Railers of the ECHL.

Playing career
Almeida played in the United States Hockey League with the Omaha Lancers in the 2007–08 season, scoring the goal in overtime of the final's to win the playoff championship. He started to play for the Boston College Eagles in Hockey East in the 2008–09 season. Almeida played on two NCAA national championships teams in 2010, and 2012.

Almeida signed an amateur try-out contract upon the completion of his collegiate career with affiliate of the Washington Capitals, the Hershey Bears on April 9, 2012. He scored his first professional goal in his professional debut against the Worcester Sharks.

On April 30, 2012 he was extended by Hershey to a one-year, two way AHL contract.

In the 2013–14 season, Almeida signed an AHL contract with the Milwaukee Admirals. He failed to make the team out of training camp and was assigned to ECHL club, the Cincinnati Cyclones for the duration of the year.

After helping the Cyclone reach the Kelly Cup finals, Almeida signed his first European contract, agreeing to a one-year deal with Kallinge-Ronneby IF in the Swedish Division 1 on June 11, 2014. Failing to adapt to the Hockeyettan, Almeida opted to return to North America and signed a one-year ECHL contract with the Utah Grizzlies on September 30, 2014.

After two seasons with the Grizzlies, Almeida left the club alongside cousin and teammate T.J. Syner, to sign abroad for Italian club, HC Gherdëina of the Alps Hockey League on June 2, 2016. In November 2016, Almeida along with Syner moved to the UK to sign for the Coventry Blaze of the Elite Ice Hockey League. In scoring 40 points in 39 games, Almeida later departed Coventry, with Syner, in May 2017.

On June 26, 2017, Almeida continued his playing partnership with Syner by signing a one-year contract in a return to the ECHL with inaugural club, Worcester Railers.

Career statistics

Awards and honors

References

External links

1988 births
American men's ice hockey centers
Boston College Eagles men's ice hockey players
Cincinnati Cyclones (ECHL) players
Coventry Blaze players
Hershey Bears players
Ice hockey players from Massachusetts
Living people
American people of Portuguese descent
Omaha Lancers players
Sportspeople from Springfield, Massachusetts
Reading Royals players
USA Hockey National Team Development Program players
Utah Grizzlies (ECHL) players
Worcester Railers players
AHCA Division I men's ice hockey All-Americans